The Best of O'Bryan is a compilation of the Capitol Records career of R&B singer O'Bryan.

Content

Nine previously released tracks were taken as singles from their respective albums -- "The Gigolo," "Still Water (Love)," "You And I," "I'm Freaky," "Lovelite," "Breakin' Together," "Go On And Cry, "Tenderoni" and "Driving Force." Several of the songs were the single mix versions, including O'Bryan's biggest hits "You And I," "I'm Freaky" and "Lovelite."

"Lovelite" topped the Billboard R&B Singles charts in 1984, while "The Gigolo" peaked at No. 5. "I'm Freaky (No. 15)" and O'Bryan's cover of the Stevie Wonder song "You And I (No. 19)" also reached the top 20 of the Billboard R&B Singles charts.

Track listing

References

1986 compilation albums
O'Bryan albums
Capitol Records compilation albums